Scolopia crassipes is a species of plant in the family Salicaceae. It is endemic to Sri Lanka.

Description
Leaves very variable, oblong-ovate, cordate to rounded base, acute to obtuse apex, margins faintly scalloped.

Trunk
Bark - gray; branches slender, compound axillary spines.

Flowers
White; Inflorescence - simple racemes shorter than leaves.

Fruits
Bright red, fleshy, ovoid berry.

Ecology
Monsoon, intermediate, and rain forest understory.

Culture
Known as ක‍ටු කුරුදු (katu kurundu) in Sinhala.

External links
 http://www.ipni.org/ipni/idPlantNameSearch.do;jsessionid=77BECE62359DD9B842283ABDFB25A844?id=112087-1&back_page=%2Fipni%2FeditAdvPlantNameSearch.do%3Bjsessionid%3D77BECE62359DD9B842283ABDFB25A844%3Ffind_infragenus%3D%26find_isAPNIRecord%3Dtrue%26find_geoUnit%3D%26find_includePublicationAuthors%3Dtrue%26find_addedSince%3D%26find_family%3D%26find_genus%3DScolopia%26find_isGCIRecord%3Dtrue%26find_infrafamily%3D%26find_rankToReturn%3D%26find_publicationTitle%3D%26find_authorAbbrev%3D%26find_infraspecies%3D%26find_includeBasionymAuthors%3Dtrue%26find_modifiedSince%3D%26find_isIKRecord%3Dtrue%26find_species%3D%26output_format%3Dnormal
 http://zipcodezoo.com/Plants/S/Scolopia_schreberi/
 http://gni.globalnames.org/name_strings?page=275&search_term=ns%3ASCO*
 http://arctos.database.museum/name/Scolopia%20schreberi
 http://www2.bishopmuseum.org/HBS/botany/cultivatedplants/?pg=search&str=flacourtiaceae&fld=&lngID=887655681

Endemic flora of Sri Lanka
schreberi
Taxa named by Johann Friedrich Gmelin